Lists of Indian people are lists of people from India. They are grouped by various criteria, including ethnicity,  states and union territories and city.

By state or union territory

States 
List of people from Andhra Pradesh
List of people from Arunachal Pradesh
List of people from Assam
List of people from Bihar
List of people from Chhattisgarh
List of people from Goa
List of people from Gujarat
List of people from Haryana
List of people from Himachal Pradesh
List of people from Jharkhand
List of people from Karnataka
List of people from Kerala
List of people from Madhya Pradesh
List of people from Maharashtra
:Category:People from Manipur
:Category:People from Meghalaya
:Category:People from Mizoram
List of people from Nagaland
List of people from Odisha
List of people from Punjab, India
List of people from Rajasthan
List of people from Sikkim
List of people from Tamil Nadu
List of people from Telangana
List of people from Tripura
List of people from Uttar Pradesh
List of people from Uttarakhand
List of people from West Bengal

Union Territories 

 :Category:People from the Andaman and Nicobar Islands
 :Category:People from Chandigarh
 :Category:People from Dadra and Nagar Haveli and Daman and Diu
 List of people from Delhi
 List of people from Jammu and Kashmir
 :Category:People from Lakshadweep
 :Category:People from Ladakh
 List of people from Pondicherry

By ethnicity 
 List of Maithils
 List of Bengalis
 List of Sindhis
 List of Punjabi people
 List of Marathi people
 List of Tamil people
 List of Telugu people
 List of Kashmiris

By occupation 

 List of Indian archers
 List of Indian artists
 List of Indian painters
 List of Indian poets
 List of Indian scientists

See also

 Lists of people by nationality

Lists of people by nationality